Gomphocymbella is a genus of diatoms belonging to the family Cymbellaceae.

Species
 

Species:

Gomphocymbella ancyli 
Gomphocymbella aschersonii 
Gomphocymbella asymmetrica

References

Cymbellales
Diatom genera